S.M. Imamul Huq is a Bangladeshi academic. He was a professor of the Department of Soil, Water & Environment, University of Dhaka. He served as vice-chancellor of the University of Barisal from 2015 to 2019.

Education 
In 1970, Huq graduated from the University of Dhaka with a B.Sc. degree in soil science, and the following year finished an M.Sc. degree in the same subject. He completed a second M.Sc. in agricultural soil and water engineering from Asian Institute of Technology (AIT), Bangkok, Thailand, in 1980. In 1984, he received a D. Engg. from the University of Nancy I, France, for his dissertation Comparaison de la résistance au stress salin de Vigna sinensis (L.) Savi et de Phaseolus aureus Roxb.

Career 
Huq joined the faculty at the University of Dhaka in 1973 as a lecturer in soil science. From 2005 to 2008, he served as chair of the Department of Soil, Water and Environment.

Huq was appointed to a four-year term as vice-chancellor of the University of Barisal in May 2015. Late in his tenure, students began protesting, alleging that they had been excluded from the university's Independence Day commemoration. Tensions escalated after Huq used the expression "razakarer bachcha" (children of collaborators with Pakistan), which the students believed was directed at them. The following day students padlocked the academic building and boycotted classes. Authorities closed the campus the next day, and Huq apologized, saying he had been misunderstood. Students responded by burning him in effigy. Student protests demanding his resignation continued for a month. At the end of April 2019, Huq was granted leave for the remainder of his term as vice-chancellor.

References

External links
  

Living people
Year of birth missing (living people)
Place of birth missing (living people)
20th-century Bangladeshi people
University of Dhaka alumni
Asian Institute of Technology alumni
Nancy-Université alumni
Academic staff of the University of Dhaka
Vice-Chancellors of the University of Rajshahi
Academic staff of the University of Rajshahi
Vice-Chancellors of the University of Barishal